NGC 6166 is an elliptical galaxy in the Abell 2199 cluster. It lies 490 million light years away in the constellation Hercules. The primary galaxy in the cluster, it is one of the most luminous galaxies known in terms of X-ray emissions.

Description
NGC 6166 is a supermassive, type cD galaxy, with several smaller galaxies within its envelope.

Suspected to have formed through a number of galaxy collisions, NGC 6166 has a large number of globular clusters (estimated as between 6,200 and 22,000 in 1996) orbiting the galaxy. A 2016 study, however, gave an even higher number (around 39,000) suggesting also that the halo of this galaxy blends smoothly with the intra-cluster medium.
Because of that, the galaxy has the richest globular cluster system known.
The galaxy harbors a supermassive black hole at its center with a mass of nearly 30 billion  based on dynamical modelling.

NGC 6166 is known to host an active nucleus, classified as an FR I source, which powers two symmetric parsec-scale radio jets and radio lobes. These are caused by the infall of gas into its center due to a cooling flow that deposits 200 solar masses of gas every year there.

It has been proposed that a number of O-type stars may be present in the center of NGC 6166.

See also
 List of galaxies

References

External links
 

58265
Abell 2199
Active galaxies
Hercules (constellation)
Radio galaxies
6166
10409
Elliptical galaxies